Şırnak Province is a province in Turkey in the Southeastern Anatolia Region. Şırnak Province was created in 1990, with areas that were formerly part of the Siirt and Mardin Provinces. It borders both Kurdistan Region of Iraq and Syria. The current Governor of the province is Ali Hamza Pehlivan.

The province had a population of 546,589 in 2021. It encompasses 19 municipalities, 240 villages and 192 hamlets.

Considered part of Turkish Kurdistan, the province has a Kurdish majority.

Geography

Şırnak Province has some mountainous regions in the west and the south, but the majority of the province consists of plateaus, resulting from the many rivers that cross it. These include the Tigris (and its tributaries Hezil and Kızılsu) and Çağlayan. The most important mountains are Mount Cudi (2089 m), Mount Gabar, Mount Namaz and Mount Altın.

Districts

Şırnak province is divided into seven districts (center district in bold):
Beytüşşebap District
Cizre District
Güçlükonak District
İdil District
Silopi District
Şırnak District
Uludere District

History

Inspectorate-General 
In order to Turkify the local population, in June 1927, Law 1164 was passed, which allowed the creation of Inspectorates-General (Umumi Müffetişlik, UM). The province was included in the First Inspectorate General, which covered the provinces of Hakkâri, Siirt, Van, Mardin, Şırnak Bitlis, Sanlıurfa, Elaziğ, and Diyarbakır. The First Inspectorate General was established in January 1928 and had its headquarters in Diyarbakır. The UM was governed by an Inspector General, who governed with a wide-ranging authority over civilian, juridical and military matters. In 1948 the policy of governing the province within the Inspectorate General was abandoned and the administration was not re-employed again, but the office of the Inspector General was only dissolved in 1952 during the government of the Democrat Party.

Kurdish-Turkish conflict 
Şırnak has been a focal point in the ongoing Kurdish-Turkish conflict, which began in 1984. From its creation in 1990 to 2002, Şırnak Province was part of the OHAL (state of emergency) region which was declared to counter the Kurdistan Workers Party (PKK) and governed by a supergovernor, who was given additional powers than a normal Turkish provincial governor, including the power to relocate and resettle whole settlements. In December 1990, the supergovernor and the provincial governors in the OHAL region received absolute immunity from prosecution in connection with decisions they made under Decree No. 430.

Turkish Forces' operation, 1992 

On 18 August 1992 Turkish forces attacked the city, killing 54 people, mostly children and women. For three days homes were burned, livestock were killed, and people were killed. 20,000 out of 25,000 residents fled the city, Amnesty International reported.

During the operation, a curfew was imposed in the town and when it finally ended, the whole city was in ruins.

While the town was under bombardment, there was no way to get an account of what was happening in the region as journalists were prevented from entering the city centre which was completely burned down by the security forces. Şırnak was under fire for three days and tanks and cannons were used to hit buildings occupied by civilians.

On 26 August 1992, Amnesty International sent requests to then Prime Minister, Süleyman Demirel, Interior Minister İsmet Sezgin, Emergency Legislation Governor Ünal Erkan and Şırnak province governor Mustafa Mala, to immediately initiate an independent and impartial inquiry into the events, to ensure no-one was mistreated in police custody and to make their results public.

2015-2016 Clashes
The 2015–16 Şırnak clashes took place in Şırnak City, Cizre, Idil and Silopi. On 14 March 2016 a curfew was declared in Şırnak province. This marked the start of an 80 day long operation against Kurdish militant in the province.  The curfew remained in place for 9 months. 2,044 buildings were destroyed during the military operation.

References 

 
Provinces of Turkey
Turkish Kurdistan